Conchita Gentil Arcos (1897 – 23 December 1982) was a Mexican actress of the Golden Age of Mexican cinema as a character actress in supporting roles.

She was the sister of María Gentil Arcos, also an actress in the Golden Age of Mexican cinema; Conchita began her work as an actress in 1932, while María did not start her career until 1938. Conchita starred in comedies such as Mi viuda alegre ("My Cheerful Widow") in 1941 or Romeo and Juliet in 1943, as well as in Music, Poetry and Madness in 1947, as the dreamy and romantic aunt by Meche Barba's character, a fan of adventure novels that falls in love with Marcelo Chávez's character, or in The Lost Child, also in 1947, alongside Chávez and Germán Valdés. She also appeared as the usurer who flirts with Pedro Infante's character only to be murdered in Nosotros los Pobres in 1947.

The writer Carlos Monsiváis referred to her (alongside her sister María) as one of the "complementary faces" of Mexican cinema, writing, "After all, they are not many, but their years on the screen make them a tribe..."

Selected filmography

Una vida por otra (1932)
La Llorona (1933) as Criada
The Woman of the Port (1934) as Vecina
La Zandunga (1938) as Doña Mariquita (uncredited)
Dos cadetes (1938) as Luz
Beautiful Mexico (1938) as Doña Ángeles
En un burro tres baturros (1939) as Antonia Terruel
Calumnia (1939) as Doña Refugio
In the Times of Don Porfirio (1940) as Doña Julia
Poor Devil (1940) as Blandina
Miente y serás feliz (1940) as Doña Julita
¡Que viene mi marido! (1940) as Genoveva
Here's the Point (1940) as Loretito
El jefe máximo (1940)
El secreto de la monja (1940) as Bereguela
El rápido de las 9.15 (1941) as Toñita, casera (uncredited)
Simón Bolívar (1942) as Señora del Toro
The Black Angel (1942) as Doña Meche
¡Así se quiere en Jalisco! (1942) as Doña Tula
The Rock of Souls (1943) as Madame (as Concha Gentil Arcos)
Tierra de pasiones (1943) as Doña Albina (uncredited)
Cinco fueron escogidos (1943) as Marfa
Romeo and Juliet (1943)
Saint Francis of Assisi (1944)
My Memories of Mexico (1944) as Tía Blandina
Michael Strogoff (1944) as Mujer en tren
Nana (1944) as Zoe
Gran Hotel (1944) as Doña Estefania
The Intruder (1944) (uncredited)
Porfirio Díaz (1944)
La trepadora (1944) as Cándida (uncredited)
Alma de bronce (1944)
El secreto de la solterona (1945) as Federica (as C. Gentil Arcos)
Mischievous Susana (1945) as Clienta en zapateria
The Museum of Crime (1945) as Clementina Cardoso de Ramos
La devoradora (1946) as Jacinta
El Superhombre (1946) 
Five Faces of Woman (1947) as Casera de Roberto (as Concha Gentil Arcos)
The Lost Child (1947) as Pita Torre
Nosotros los Pobres (1948) as La prestamista
Music, Poetry and Madness (1948) as Doña Altagracia (as Conchita G. Arcos)
El cuarto mandamiento (1948) as María Luisa Lucio, enfermera abortista (uncredited) 
A Family Like Many Others (1949) as Doña Jovita, invitada a fiesta (uncredited)
Philip of Jesus (1949) as Invitada a recital (uncredited)
Dos pesos dejada (1949) as Doña Refugio
Confessions of a Taxi Driver (1949) as Doña Remedios
Love for Love (1950) as Doña Lucecita
Cuatro contra el mundo (1950) as Doña Trini
The Doorman (1950) as Doña Cuca, vecina
History of a Heart (1951) as Miembro educativo
Daughter of Deceit (1951) as Toña García
Woman Without Tears (1951) as Sarita (uncredited)
Acá las tortas (1951) as Manuelita
The Atomic Fireman (1952) as Vecina de Guadalupe (uncredited)
El fronterizo (1952) as Tía Mechita
Neither Rich nor Poor (1953)
Here Come the Freeloaders (1953) as Señora Correa del Toro Prieto (uncredited)
Seven Women (1953) 
The Second Woman (1953) as Juliana
The Photographer (1953) as Mamá de Chelito
What Can Not Be Forgiven (1953) as Nana Rafaela
Illusion Travels by Streetcar (1954) as Pasajera con santo
Romance de fieras (1954) as Tía Remedios
A Tailored Gentleman (1954) as Doña Manuelita (as Concha Gentil Arcos)
Los Fernández de Peralvillo (1954) as Doña Esperanza
El fantasma de la casa roja (1956) as Romula Feucha
The King of Mexico (1956) as Dueña de vitrina
Las medias de seda (1956) as Trabajadora chismosa
Las aventuras de Pito Pérez (1957) as Espectadora de falso misionero (uncredited)
Asesinos, S.A. (1957) as Profesora de gimnasia (as Conchita G. Arcos)
Chucho el Roto (1960)
Ruletero a toda marcha (1962) as Anciana samaritana

References

Bibliography

External links

1897 births
1982 deaths
Mexican film actresses
Spanish film actresses
20th-century Mexican actresses
20th-century Spanish actresses
People from Valencia
Spanish emigrants to Mexico